Alexander Vasilievich Loganovsky (Russian: Александр Васильевич Логановский; 11 March 1810, Moscow - 18 November 1855, Moscow) was a Russian sculptor and academician; known primarily for his bas-reliefs. His birth year is sometimes given as 1812.

Biography 
In 1821, he began his studies at the Imperial Academy of Arts. During his time there, he was awarded several medals, including a large silver medal for his depiction of Jupiter and Mercury visiting Philemon and Baucis (1831), and a small gold medal for a bas-relief of Hector reproaching Paris (1832). The following year, He received a large gold medal for his statue of a young man playing svaika. This was created in conjunction with Nikolai Pimenov, who produced a statue of a young man playing babka. Both were praised by Alexander Pushkin in a short poem, and are now on display at Alexander Palace.

Following his graduation, he received a stipend to study in Rome. While there, he created a marble figure of Abbadon and a group depicting young people from Kiev in gypsum, for which he was awarded the title of "Academician".  Upon returning, he created two bas-reliefs for Saint Isaac's Cathedral: an "Annunciation to the Shepherds" and a "Massacre of the Innocents".

Since 1839, together with Peter Clodt, Nikolai Ramazanov, and others, he had been involved in a project to create colossal relief images and figures of saints and angels for the outer walls of the Cathedral of Christ the Saviour; a project which took almost forty years to complete. In 1854, partly in honor of his work there, he was named a Professor at the Academy. He died the following year.

References

Further reading
 "Alexander Loganovsky: Life is Like a Meteorite" @ Московская правда
 Biography @ Санкт-Петербург и пригороды
 Biography @ Всё о цвете (It's All About Color)
 Biography @ the Православная Энциклопедия

External links

1810 births
1855 deaths
Russian sculptors
Imperial Academy of Arts alumni
Members of the Imperial Academy of Arts
Artists from Moscow